European Champion Clubs Cup may refer to:

 European Champion Clubs' Cup, association football cup of European club national champions
 European Champion Clubs Cup (athletics), athletics cup of European club national champions